Francesco Cancellotti (born 27 February 1963) is a former tennis player from Italy.

Cancellotti won two singles titles during his professional career. He reached his career-high ATP singles ranking on 15 April 1985 as world No. 21.

Career finals

Singles (2 wins, 5 losses)

Doubles (1 runner-up)

References

External links
 
 
 

1963 births
Living people
Italian male tennis players
Sportspeople from Perugia
Mediterranean Games gold medalists for Italy
Mediterranean Games medalists in tennis
Competitors at the 1983 Mediterranean Games
20th-century Italian people